Oiga may refer to one of two places in Tibet:

Oiga, Ngari Prefecture - western Tibet
Oiga, Nyingchi Prefecture - south eastern Tibet